Omitara railway station is a railway station serving the settlement of Omitara in Namibia. It is part of the TransNamib Railway, located along the Windhoek to Gobabis line.

Railway stations in Namibia
TransNamib Railway
Buildings and structures in Omaheke Region